The Brigade des Fusiliers Marins was a unit of the French Navy which fought alongside the Belgium Army in 1914-1915 and which held their ground until the last man standing in October 1914 at Diksmuide to halt the advance of the German army and protect Dunkirk.

Origin 

When war was declared in August 1914, the French Navy housed idle Fusiliers Marins on board naval ships, due to the principal combats being conducted on land. To make use of these men, it was decided on August 7, 1914, to create a strong brigade of 6,000 men organized into two regiments which would become the 1st and 2nd Regiment of Fusiliers Marins. The command of the brigade was entrusted to Pierre Alexis Ronarc'h, recently promoted to Counter Admiral. The first confined mission was defend the capital and outskirts to which garrison belong to.

Organization 

The brigade was constituted of one headquarter staff, two regiments and one mitrailleuse company of 15 platoons. Each regiment was commanded by a Capitaine de Vaisseau and each was formed of a headquarter staff along with 3 battalions.

Recruitment 

In the composition of the brigade, was 700 very young Fusiliers Marins apprentices (Young volunteers barely sixteen and a half year of age), reservist of the depot at Lorient, and mechanics in the Fleet. The extremely young composition astonished the Parisians.

They were joined at Paris by reinforcements hailing from the other ports: Rochefort, Brest, Cherbourg and Toulon. These reinforcements included more senior Fusiliers Marins and volunteers, which all quickly transformed to land soldiers of the French Army.

Sent to Belgium for reinforcements 

In October 1914, the Germans in numbers threatened to annihilate Belgian defenses. The brigade's mission was to leave Paris and reinforce the Belgian Army, a mission also confined to the 87th Territorial Infantry Division. The purpose was to aid the Belgian Army to deploy in France and protect the strategic port of Dunkirk.

The brigade was transported by train into Flanders, then made its way to Antwerp and the Belgian Army. At Ghent, the brigade came to a halt; the train tracks were cut from there on.

The Fusiliers Marins engaged in combat at Melles, Belgium on October 9, 10, and 11 to protect the retreat of the Belgian troops evacuating Antwerp. Then, the brigade went to Diksmuide, which they reached on October 15 after a long tiring march. Followed by fifty thousand Germans, men who were used to live barefooted on ship decks at sea, were marching thirty to forty kilometers.

On the following day, October 16, while the defense line of the Fusiliers Marins was barely put into effect, the Germans launched their first wave of attacks with artillery and infantry. Combats in Diksmuide had just begun. Opposing 6,000 Fusiliers Marins of the brigade commanded by Admiral Pierre Alexis Ronarc'h and 5,000 Belgians commanded by colonel Jean-Baptiste Meiser, were three German army reserve corps under the orders of Albrecht, Duke of Württemberg, with almost 30,000 men.

Battle of Diksmuide 

On October 24 at 2100, the Duke of Württemberg launched a general attack with objective to pierce the front in the direction of Veurne. Two columns assaulted the front at Nieuwpoort-Diksmuide, held by the Belgians, and two other columns converged on Diksmuide, after a formidable artillery preparation.

On October 26, the Fusiliers Marins were reinforced by 2nd Mixed Colonial Regiment (2e RCM). A Troupes de Marine colonial regiment, part of the 1st brigade of the Moroccan Division under the orders of lieutenant-colonel Pelletier, this regiment was composed of two battalions: the 3rd Senegalese Battalion of Algeria under commandant Frèrejean and the 1st Senegalese Battalion of Algeria under commandant Brochot.

On October 28, a decision was taken, to open the valves and flood the left bank of Yser between this river and the railway of Diksmuide at Nieuwpoort, rendering Diksmuide almost an artificial island. These floods saved the situation on Yser.

On November 10, the defenders of Diksmuide were constrained, following intense combats which finished corps à corps down to the bayonet, to abandon the city in flames and to pass over again to the left bank.

They were entrusted to hold the town for four days, yet, they held the town for three weeks, while facing an opposition of almost 50,000.

Outcome 

Losses for the defenders were significant. Three thousand men were either killed or removed from the fight: 23 officers, 37 marine officers, 450 quarter-masters and sailors; 52 officers, 108 marine officers, 1,774 quarter-masters and sailors wounded; 698 taken prisoner or missing.

In the Senegalese Tirailleurs, only 400 men remained in the Frèrejean battalion and 11, out of which one captain, of the Brochot battalion: 411 survivors out of 2,000.

On November 15, the offensive was permanently halted.

After the battle 

The sacrifice of the brigade had a significant effect in France. This unit didn't have a flag. Accordingly, the survivors of the Brigade de Fusiliers Marins were assembled near Dunkirk on January 11, 1915. Raymond Poincaré, President of France, accompanied by Victor Augagneur, Minister of the Navy, bestowed on Admiral Ronarc'h the flag of the Fusiliers Marins whose Color guard was entrusted to the 2nd Regiment.

End of January 1915, the brigade garrisoned in the sector Nieuwpoort.

From January to May 1915, the fronts in Flanders progressively stabilized until the Allied offensive in July 1917.

Dissolution of the brigade 

In November 1915 in France, the French government decided to dissolve the Brigade de Fusiliers Marins, following the request demand of the French Navy who needed its personnel to engage in a Submarine warfare. The flag of the Fusiliers Marins remained at the front with a battalion, a military bridge building company with eight platoon mitrailleuses. The role of the two regiments was closed on December 10, 1915.

During the sixteen months at the front, the Brigade de Fusiliers Marins endured the loss, wounded or disappeared, 172 Officers, 346 Officiers Mariniers, and almost 6000 Quarter-Masters and Marins, the equivalent of the initial composition of the brigade, composed in majority of Bretons.

See also 

Fusiliers marins

References

Sources 
Charles Le Goffic, Dixmude, un chapitre de l'histoire des fusiliers marins, Librairie Plon, 1915.
Vice-amiral Ronarc'h, Souvenirs de la guerre, Payot, 1921.
Ferdinand Foch, Mémoires pour servir à l’histoire de la guerre de 1914–1918.
Roger Laouenan, Des demoiselles au feu, l'épopée des fusiliers marins, Coop Breizh, 2004.

Military units and formations of France in World War I
Brigades of France